The 2000–01 Mighty Ducks of Anaheim season was the team's eighth season. The Mighty Ducks failed to qualify for the playoffs for the second year in a row and finished last in the West.

Offseason

After missing the 2000 playoffs by only four points, the Mighty Ducks were quite hopeful to return to the post season.
Anaheim was very busy during the summer trading and acquiring a lot prospects and were active on the free agent market as well.

Trying to improve their scoring depth and not relying too much on Kariya and Selanne, the Mighty Ducks signed German Titov and acquired Andrej Nazarov who had a career year in goals (10) and points (31).

Other free agents were Dan Bylsma, Petr Tenkrat as well as Jim Cummins and Kevin Sawyer who were signed to provide the necessary protection for their star players since they lost Stu Grimson to the Kings as a free agent. The team became much more European-based making up half the roster, mainly on their defense (6).

Acquired a 2000 2nd round Draft pick (Jonas Ronnqvist) for Trent Hunter from the New York Islanders on May 23, 2000

Acquired a 2001 4th Draft pick for Espen Knutsen from the Columbus Blue Jackets on May 25, 2000

Acquired a 2000 4th Draft pick for the rights to Stephen Peat from the Washington Capitals on June 1, 2000

Acquired Jean-Sebastien Giguere for a 2000 2nd round Draft pick from the Calgary Flames on June 10, 2000

Acquired Patrick Traverse for Joel Kwiatkowski from the Ottawa Senators on June 12, 2000

Acquired a 2001 7th round Draft pick for Ed Ward from the New Jersey Devils on June 12, 2000

Acquired a 2000 2nd round Draft pick (Ilya Bryzgalov) for a 2000 3rd (Jozef Balej), 4th (Michel Ouellet) and 5th (Ryan Glenn) round Draft pick from the Montreal Canadiens on June 24, 2000

Acquired the rights to Jonathan Hedstrom for a 2000 6th and 7th round Draft pick from the Toronto Maple Leafs on June 25, 2000

Acquired Andrej Nazarov and a 2001 2nd round Draft pick for the rights to Jordan Leopold from the Calgary Flames on September 26, 2000

Regular season

The season proved to be very tough as the team never found consistency. Things looked pretty good going 6-4-3-2 until November 4, when the team started having trouble coming back after being winless for five games twice in November, going 2-8-3-1 which lead the team to trade Traverse and Nazarov to the Boston Bruins for Samuel Pahlsson on November 18. To make matters even worse, Center Steve Rucchin was hit in the face by a shot on November 15, 2000 missing the rest of the season. Despite his absence the Ducks improved by mid December nearing the .500 mark by two games with a 5-3-0-0 record until December 17, 2000 but finishing the month 5-7-1-1. Anaheim fired Head Coach Craig Hartsburg on December 13, 2000 after winning against the Blue Jackets replacing him with assistant coach Guy Charron though the move did not improve their performance. Despite this roller coaster ride the Mighty Ducks experienced, they were still in the Play Off race with a 14-19-6-4 record by January 5, 2001. On January 10 the Mighty Ducks waived Dominic Roussel resulting in Giguere becoming their new backup, believing him and Hebert would carry the team into the Play Offs and pass on the torch carefully to a new number one during the season.

But all those hopes were shattered as the Mighty Ducks lost sixteen games by March 2 going 4-16-2-1. During that stretch Hebert went 0-11-2 and losing his starting position by February much sooner to Giguere then expected. Though Hebert did not quite play as well as he did the last two seasons, much of this was based on the team not giving him the necessary support he needed as Selanne stated in an interview, expressing his frustrations and disappointment. Hebert faced thirty or more shots almost every game, yet was able to keep his save percentage close to the .900 mark.
Their longest winning streak was five games in early March 2001 when it was clear the team was not going to make the Play Offs. During the winning streak Anaheim sent Teemu Selanne to the Sharks in exchange for Jeff Friesen and Steve Shields. Shields' acquisition ended Hebert's tenure with the Mighty Ducks getting waived and picked up by the New York Rangers on March 7 to replace the injured Mike Richter. A week later, Jason Marshall was traded to Washington on March 13. Shields never dressed for the Ducks that season due to an injury and the team called up Gregg Naumenko to serve behind J.-S. Giguere. Anaheim's GM Pierre Gauthier felt very confident and fans would accept the trade once the new arrivals dressed for their new team, calling both moves a huge change and necessary as the team needed to look forward and both players would improve the franchise immediately and long term as well. (SunJournal March 6, 2001)

While Selanne enjoyed much success with San Jose, the same could not be said about Anaheim as the Ducks went 2-6-3 after their five-game winning streak, which had fans and experts worried whether the deal with the Sharks was actually worth it. The Mighty Ducks went 11-22-5-1 in the second half with a lot of open questions about the team's future identity with longtime players Hebert, Marshall and Selanne gone.

The Defense was the weak link as the team allowed the second most goals in the west with 245, behind Chicago with 246. Their goaltending was heavily effected by that, too as Guy Hebert and Dominic Roussel recorded a save percentage below .900 which was the first time in team history. In hopes of more scoring depth and not relying on their first line of Paul Kariya, Teemu Selanne and Steve Rucchin, the acquisitions of Andrei Nazarov and German Titov did not pay off at all as the team was at the bottom in scoring. Marty McInnes refound his scoring touch, Tverdovsky ranked third in team scoring, Mike Leclerc had a very good second season despite missing 28 games. Traverse and Nazarov were traded early in mid December as both did not live up to their expectations. The European youngsters showed some talent but could not fill the scoring void left by Rucchin who played only 16 games.

The season marked the start of a new era: in goal, the team waived goaltender Guy Hebert (the last remaining original Mighty Duck from the 1993 NHL Expansion Draft) while focusing on Jean-Sebastien Giguere as their new starter. Their defence lost a valuable cornerstone with Jason Marshall after 6 years. It also marked the breakup of one of the best two players at the time by trading Teemu Selanne to San Jose without improving the team in scoring.

Final standings

Schedule and results

Player statistics

Regular season
Scoring

Goaltending

Awards and records

Transactions

Acquired Samuel Pahlsson from the Boston Bruins in exchange for Andrei Nazarov and Patrick Traverse on November 18, 2000

Waived Dominic Roussel, picked up by the Edmonton Oilers on January 10, 2001

Traded Ladislav Kohn to the Atlanta Thrashers for Scott Langkow and Sergej Vyshedkevich on February 9, 2001

Waived Guy Hebert, picked up the New York Rangers March 7, 2001

Traded Teemu Selanne to the San Jose Sharks for Jeff Friesen, Steve Shields and a 2nd Round Draft Pick on March 5, 2001

Traded Jason Marshall to the Washington Capitales for Alexei Tezikov and a 4th round Draft pick on March 13, 2001

Draft picks
Anaheim's draft picks at the 2000 NHL Entry Draft held at the Pengrowth Saddledome in Calgary, Alberta.

Farm teams
Cincinnati Mighty Ducks ( shared with the Detroit Red Wings )

See also 
2000–01 NHL season

References

Anaheim Ducks seasons
Anaheim
Anaheim
Mighty Ducks of Anaheim
Mighty Ducks of Anaheim